Hogbin is a surname. Notable people with the surname include:
 Emma Jane Hogbin (born 1977), Canadian technical writer, free software advocate and politician
 George Hogbin (died 1937), British priest
 Henry Hogbin (1880–1966), English businessman and politician
 Ian Hogbin (1904–1989), Australian anthropologist